Sticta rhizinata is a species of foliose lichen in the family Peltigeraceae. Found in Colombia, it was formally described by Bibiana Moncada and Robert Lücking in 2012. It is a member of the Sticta weigelii species complex. Here it grows on the ground, often associated with bryophytes of the genera Plagiochila, Frullania, Metzgeria, Campylopus, and Dicranum. Frequent lichen associates include Everniastrum, Hypotrachyna, and Peltigera. The specific epithet rhizinata refers to its conspicuous rhizines.

References

rhizinata
Lichen species
Lichens described in 2012
Lichens of Colombia
Taxa named by Robert Lücking